The siege of Saint-Jean-d'Angély took place from February to August 1351 when a French army besieged an English garrison within the town of Saint-Jean-d'Angély, Saintonge, France during the Hundred Years' War. An English relief force was victorious at the Battle of Saintes, however was unable to relieve the town. With the personal appearance of King John II of France at the siege, the English garrison surrendered.

Siege
John II ordered a siege of Saint-Jean-d'Angély, a town in Saintonge. An army made up of Poitevin, Saintongeais, Tourangeaux and Angevins knights and foot soldiers, was formed and set up camp at the foot of the walls of Saint-Jean-d'Angély. The army was led by Guy II de Nesle, Marshal of France and Édouard I de Beaujeu.

The French did not take any initiative to attack the city because they lacked large enough siege engines to break the walls of Saint-Jean-d'Angély. The town was surrounded and trade routes blocked to starve the English garrison into surrendering. An English relief force led by the Seneschal of Gascony, John de Cheverston and Arnaud-Amanieu, was intercepted by a French detachment of the siege army. Although the English were victorious, Cheverston was unable to break through to Saint-Jean-d'Angély.

Upon the capture of Guy II de Nesle, Marshal of France, John II headed to the siege of Saint-Jean-d'Angély. In August 1351, with the presence of the King of France, the inhabitants opened the gates of Saint-Jean-d'Angély to the French.

Citations

References

Sieges of the Hundred Years' War
Conflicts in 1351
1351 in England
1350s in France
Hundred Years' War, 1337–1360